Ebba Segerberg is an academic and translator, noted for her translations of Swedish literature into English.

Segerberg is a Director of Communications at Washington University in St. Louis. She earned a Ph.D. from the University of California Berkeley, Department of Scandinavian in 1999. She has contributed to The Dictionary of Literary Biography: 20th Century Swedish Writers.

Selected bibliography

Translator

 John Ajvide Lindqvist, Let the Right One In, St. Martin's Griffin/Thomas Dunne Books, New York, 2008 
 Henning Mankell, One Step Behind, New Press ; Distributed by W.W. Norton, New York, 2002 
 Henning Mankell, Firewall, New Press : Distributed by W.W. Norton, New York, 2002  
 Henning Mankell, Before the Frost, New Press : Distributed by W.W. Norton, New York, 2005 
 Kjell Eriksson, The princess of Burundi, Thomas Dunne Books/St. Martin's Minotaur, New York, 2006 
 Kjell Eriksson, The Cruel Stars of the Night, Thomas Dunne Books/St. Martin's Minotaur, New York, 2007, 
 John Ajvide Lindqvist, Let Me In, Thomas Dunne Books, New York, 2007 
 Henning Mankell, The pyramid : and four other Kurt Wallander mysteries, New Press : Distributed by W.W. Norton, New York, 2008 
 Kjell Eriksson, The hand that trembles : a mystery, Minotaur Books, New York, 2011, 
 Henning Mankell, The Shadow Girls, New Press, New York, 2012,

Other publications
 Nostalgia, Narrative, and Modernity in Swedish Silent Cinema (author), Berkeley, University of California, Berkeley, 1999

References

Year of birth missing (living people)
Living people
Swedish–English translators
Washington University in St. Louis faculty
American translators
American women writers